This is a list of mayors of Wilkes-Barre, Pennsylvania, a city in the northeastern part of the U.S. state of Pennsylvania.

Buildings named after Wilkes-Barre mayors
 A restaurant in the Rolling Mill Hill section of Wilkes-Barre was named "The Hart" in honor of former mayor Daniel Hart. The restaurant closed in and was sold at Sheriff Sale in 2009.
 The John B. McGlynn Learning Center, located in the Boulevard Townhomes on Wilkes-Barre Boulevard, was founded in 1988. The learning center, was named in McGlynn's honor. John B. McGlynn served as Wilkes-Barre's 17th mayor, and did so from 1970 to 1972.

References